Bagnan College is an undergraduate liberal arts college in Bagnan, West Bengal, India. It is situated in Howrah district, and is affiliated with the University of Calcutta.

Departments

Science

Chemistry
Physics
Mathematics
Botany
Zoology
Computer Science

Arts and commerce

Bengali
English
Sanskrit
History
Political Science
Philosophy
Economics
Education
Commerce

Accreditation
The college is recognized by the University Grants Commission (UGC). It was accredited by the National Assessment and Accreditation Council (NAAC), and awarded B grade, an accreditation that has since then expired.

See also

References

External links

Educational institutions established in 1958
University of Calcutta affiliates
Universities and colleges in Howrah district
1958 establishments in West Bengal